Alexandria National Cemetery is a United States National Cemetery, of approximately , located in the city of Alexandria, Virginia. Administered by the United States Department of Veterans Affairs, it is one of the original national cemeteries that were established in 1862. As of 2014, it was site to over 4,500 interments.  The cemetery can accommodate the cremated remains of eligible individuals.

History 
As one of the original national cemeteries, it served as the burial grounds for mostly Union soldiers who died in the numerous hospitals around the Alexandria area, but by 1864 it was almost filled to capacity. This led to the development of the Arlington National Cemetery.  The remains of 39 Confederates, originally buried in the cemetery during the Civil War, were disinterred by the Daughters of the Confederacy in 1879.  The remains were reinterred in Christ Church cemetery.

Alexandria National Cemetery was listed in the National Register of Historic Places in 1995.

Notable interments

References

External links 

 National Cemetery Administration
 Alexandria National Cemetery in Virginia
 
 
 

Cemeteries in Alexandria, Virginia
Cemeteries on the National Register of Historic Places in Virginia
United States national cemeteries
National Register of Historic Places in Alexandria, Virginia
Geography of Alexandria, Virginia
Tourist attractions in Alexandria, Virginia
1862 establishments in Virginia
Historic American Landscapes Survey in Virginia